The 2014 FIRS B-World Cup was the 16th and last edition of the Roller Hockey B World Championship. It was an official competition organized by CIRH. The competition was host in Canelones, Uruguay from 15 to 22 November.

Venues
Canelones was the host city of the tournament, and the Rink will be enclosed the Sergio Matto stadium. All times are Uruguay Time (UTC-3).

Group stage

Group A

Group B

Knockout stage

Championship

(*) = After extra time

5th to 7th Place Group

Final ranking

External links
Official website
CIRH website

B
R
FIRS Men's B-Roller Hockey World Cup
B World Championship